Grand Roy is a town in Grenada. It is located on the island's west coast, in the Parish of St. John, to the north of Marigot on the road to Gouyave.

References

Populated places in Grenada